The Ministry for Culture and the Preservation of Historical and Cultural Heritage of Abkhazia (Russian: Министр культуры и сохранения историко-культурного наследия Абхазии) is a government agency of Abkhazia which holds an ministerial position in the Abkhazian government.

History

Government of President Khajimba

On 15 October 2014, after his election as President, Raul Khajimba approved the structure of the new cabinet. The State Administration for the Preservation of Historical and Cultural Heritage was adjoined to the Ministry of Culture, which was renamed the Ministry of Culture and the Preservation of Historical and Cultural Heritage.

On 15 October, Elvira Arsalia was appointed as the new Minister.

List of Ministers for Culture of Abkhazia

References